Cheryl Ortega is a Dominican beauty contest title-holder. She was Miss Tierra República Dominicana 2014.

References

Dominican Republic beauty pageant winners
Living people
Year of birth missing (living people)
Place of birth missing (living people)